The Trophée du Conseil Général is a knockout tournament of the Martinique football.

Winners
1997 : Club Franciscain (Le François)
1998 : Aiglon (Le Lamentin)
1999 : Club Franciscain (Le François)
2000 : Samaritaine (Ste.-Marie)        3-2 Club Franciscain (Le François)
2001 : Club Franciscain (Le François)  2-1 Stade Spiritain (St.-Esprit)
2002 : Club Franciscain (Le François)  1-0 Aiglon (Le Lamentin)
2003 : Club Franciscain (Le François)  4-3 CS Case-Pilote
2004 : Club Franciscain (Le François)  1-0 RC Rivière-Pilote
2005 : cancelled
2006 : Club Franciscain (Le François)   10-0 Good Luck de Fort-de-France
2007 : Club Franciscain (Le François)  3-0 RC Rivière-Pilote
2008 : Club Franciscain (Le François)  0-0 RC Rivière-Pilote [4-3 pen]
2009 : Club Franciscain (Le François)   4-1 AS Morne-des-Esses
2010 : CS Bélimois                     2-2 RC Rivière-Pilote               [4-2 pen]
2011 : Club Colonial  (Fort-de-France) 5-0 Club Peléen (Morne Rouge)
2012 : RC Rivière-Pilote 2-0 US Riveraine
2013 : Club Colonial  (Fort-de-France) 2-1 Samaritaine (Ste.-Marie)
2014 : Club Colonial  (Fort-de-France) 2-0 CS Case-Pilote
2015 : Golden Lion FC (Saint-Joseph)   3-2 Excelsior (Schoelcher) 
2016 : Golden Lion FC (Saint-Joseph)   6-0 JS Eucalyptus
2017 : Club Franciscain (Le François)   2-0 Samaritaine (Ste.-Marie)
2018 : Club Franciscain (Le François)   2-2 Golden Lion FC (Saint-Joseph) [4-2 pen]
2019 : Club Franciscain (Le François)   3-0 Golden Lion FC (Saint-Joseph)
2020 : Samaritaine (Ste.-Marie) 0-0 Club Franciscain (Le François) [5-4 pen]
2021 :

References
RSSSF.com

Football competitions in Martinique